Abraham Theodor Berge (20 August 1851 – 10 July 1936) was the 15th prime minister of Norway from 1923 to 1924. He was a teacher and civil servant who represented the Liberal Party, the social liberal party, and later Free-minded Liberal Party, a right-of-centre party.

Biography
Berge was born at Lyngdal in Lister og Mandals amt (present-day Vest-Agder), Norway . He was the son of Johan Tobias Johnsen Berge (1813–1883) and Helene Andreasdatter Kvalsvig. He attended the teacher's course offered by Reinert Rødland in Lyngdal. In 1867, Berge became teacher at the Nordbygda skole in Vanse. He also served as sheriff in Vanse from 1904 to 1908. Berge was appointed County Governor in Vestfold in 1908, a position  he held until 1924.

Berge started his political career in Lista in the present-day municipality of Farsund, where he was in 1882 elected mayor. From here he went on to the Norwegian Parliament in 1891. He served, in different periods, as both Minister of Culture and Church Affairs and Minister of Finance. Then, after a 10-year absence from politics, he became again Minister of Finance, and later also Prime Minister, when sitting Prime Minister Otto Bahr Halvorsen died. He resigned this post as the result of the defeat in a vote to lift prohibition.

In 1926 he became the only Norwegian prime minister to ever be impeached. The charge was withholding information relating to the government rescue of a bank threatened by bankruptcy. However, he was acquitted in 1927, along with the six ministers who stood trial alongside him.

Selected works
 Listerlandets kystværn og kaperfart 1807–14 (Tønsberg 1914) and Lista. En bygdebok (Tønsberg 1926). Both books reprinted 2006 by Klokkhammer Forlag AS.

References

1851 births
1936 deaths
People from Lyngdal
People from Farsund
Norwegian educators
County governors of Norway
Liberal Party (Norway) politicians
Ministers of Finance of Norway
 Recipients of the St. Olav's Medal
Ministers of Education of Norway